Nettleship is a surname. Notable people with this surname include:

Ada Nettleship (1856-1932), British dressmaker and costume designer
Edward Nettleship (1845–1913), English ophthalmologist
Henry Nettleship (1839–1893), English classical scholar.
Ida Nettleship (1877–1907), English artist
John Nettleship (1939–2011), British schoolteacher of chemistry 
John Trivett Nettleship (1841–1902), English artist
R. L. Nettleship (1846–1892), English philosopher

See also
Thomas Nettleship Staley, British bishop
Nettleship–Falls syndrome, an ocular disorder
Nettleship v Weston, English Court of Appeal judgment